"My Hero" is a song by American rock group Foo Fighters. It was released in January 1998 as the third single from their second album, The Colour and the Shape (1997). The song reached number 6 on the US Billboard Alternative Songs chart.

Background
Although the song was first released on The Colour and the Shape album in 1997, it had been played live as early as 1995. On July 17th, 1995 Grohl demoed the hit song for the first time by himself on an 8-track reel-to-reel in the basement of his Seattle home. The demo features only Grohl playing drums, bass, guitars, and singing — although the lyrics are not complete the vocal melody is the same as the final studio recording. In the Foo Fighters 2011 documentary, Foo Fighters: Back and Forth, bassist Nate Mendel states he knew the band had a future when he heard Grohl’s demo, “because the song was great”.

According to Dave Grohl, the song is dedicated to ordinary, everyday heroes, as he himself never had musical or sports heroes growing up as a child. During Foo Fighters' appearance on VH1 Storytellers in 2009, Grohl explained that the song was written while watching 1980s movies like Valley Girl. Grohl also stated that the band wrote the song about Pete Stahl and Chip Donaldson, without even knowing it.

The recording of the song itself was done using two different drum tracks played back simultaneously for the intro and verses. On one track, Dave Grohl played the bass drum, hi-hat, snare drum, and crash.  Because of the drums being recorded as double-tracked, live performances use a more simplified beat.

Music video
The music video was directed by Dave Grohl. It features a man running into a burning building to rescue a woman's baby, another woman's dog, and finally a framed picture of the first woman. The eyes of both the baby and the dog are blocked out. The camera follows the man throughout the video, with his face never being shown. It is presented in a continuous "long take" format, although actual transitional cuts are disguised by smoke. During shots inside the building, the band is seen performing the song, seemingly unconcerned about the chaos around them. It is the only Foo Fighters video to feature guitarist Franz Stahl, who replaced Pat Smear (Stahl did not appear in the video for the next and last single from the album, 1998's "Walking After You", as it featured only Grohl).

Critical reception
"My Hero" is widely regarded as one of the Foo Fighters' best songs. In 2020, Kerrang ranked the song number seven on their list of the 20 greatest Foo Fighters songs, and in 2021, American Songwriter ranked the song number one on their list of the 10 greatest Foo Fighters songs.

In the media
The song was featured in the movie Varsity Blues during the climactic scene of the final football game. The scene was later parodied in the 2001 film Not Another Teen Movie. The song also appeared in the 2010 films Somewhere and The Other Guys when part of the song was heard during the scene where two characters (played by Dwayne "The Rock" Johnson and Samuel L. Jackson) jump to their death (the song ending rather abruptly when they hit the ground).

In a post-September 11 episode of CBS's The Late Late Show with Craig Kilborn (September 21, 2001), Grohl and bassist Nate Mendel performed an acoustic rendition of the song. A full group acoustic version is available on the 2006 live album and DVD Skin and Bones. An acoustic version was also performed live on The Howard Stern Show by Grohl in 1999. The 2006 album Sound of Superman features an acoustic cover of "My Hero" by Paramore.

My Hero was featured in the game Gran Turismo 2. The song, along with the rest of the album, was released as downloadable content for the Rock Band series of music video games on November 13, 2008.

It is also one of 38 songs included on the benefit album, Songs for Japan (compiled in response to the aftermath of the earthquake and tsunami in Tōhoku), released on March 25, 2011.

Objection to use in 2008 presidential campaign
In 2008, the Foo Fighters criticized the campaign of Republican presidential candidate John McCain for using their song at rallies without their permission.

Foo Fighters responded to the incident saying: "It's frustrating and infuriating that someone who claims to speak for the American people would repeatedly show such little respect for creativity and intellectual property. . . The saddest thing about this is that 'My Hero' was written as a celebration of the common man and his extraordinary potential. To have it appropriated without our knowledge and used in a manner that perverts the original sentiment of the lyric just tarnishes the song."

The McCain campaign noted that the song was used properly under blanket licensing (which does not require the artist's permission), and all proper royalties were paid.

However, the band played a stripped down, acoustic version of the song live, during an appearance at the end of the 2012 Democratic National Convention.

Previously, Republican President George W. Bush had used Foo Fighters' 2003 single "Times Like These" during his 2004 re-election campaign without the band's knowledge or consent. This prompted the band to perform a slew of shows in support of Democratic candidate John Kerry.

Other versions 
 A live version recorded in Amsterdam February 29, 2000 was released on Live in Holland, Part Two.
 A live version recorded at the Pantages Theater in Los Angeles was released on both versions of Skin and Bones.
 A live version filmed at Hyde Park on June 17, 2006 was released on the Live at Hyde Park DVD.
 A live version filmed at Wembley Stadium on June 6, 2008 was released on the Live at Wembley Stadium DVD.

Track listings

UK single
"My Hero" - 4:21
"Baker Street" (Gerry Rafferty cover) - 5:39
"Dear Lover" - 4:34
Enhanced section Containing:
Everlong [Video]
Monkey Wrench [30sec Clip]
My Hero [Song File Format]

Japan special edition maxi single
"My Hero"
"Requiem" (Killing Joke cover)
"Drive Me Wild" (Vanity 6 cover)
"Down in the Park" (Gary Numan cover)
"Baker Street" (Gerry Rafferty cover)
"See You" (acoustic)
"For All the Cows" (Live at Toshiba-EMI Ltd on 2 April 1997 in Japan)

Australian single
"My Hero"
"Dear Lover"
"For All the Cows" (Live at Toshiba-EMI Ltd on 2 April 1997 in Japan)

Personnel
 Dave Grohl – vocals, lead guitar, drums
 Pat Smear – rhythm guitar
 Nate Mendel – bass

Covers

The song has been covered by:
The Red Jumpsuit Apparatus
Paramore for Sound of Superman.
Set Your Goals at the Hoodwink Festival in 2009.
Beloved on their Live at the Cat's Cradle album.
First to Eleven on their Covers Vol. 10 album.
 
Dave Grohl also played a solo version of it in Radio 1's Live Lounge

Charts

Weekly charts

Live version

Certifications

References

1998 singles
Foo Fighters songs
Songs written by Dave Grohl
Songs written by Pat Smear
Songs written by Nate Mendel
1997 songs
Song recordings produced by Gil Norton
Capitol Records singles